Greatest Hits is the first compilation album by American pop group The 5th Dimension, released in 1970 by Soul City.  It includes all but two of their charting singles to date:  "Go Where You Wanna Go", their first Top 20 record in the USA, would appear on the follow-up compilation, The July 5th Album, released later that year, while "Another Day, Another Heartache" was not included on either compilation.  Greatest Hits and The July 5 Album were the final two album releases for Soul City Records' distribution deal with Liberty Records.  The 5th Dimension subsequently signed with Bell Records. The album peaked at no. 5 on Billboard's Top LP's chart in the summer of 1970, achieving gold record status.

Greatest Hits remained in print until replaced by Bell Records' 1972 compilation album, Greatest Hits on Earth which confirmed The 5th Dimension's enduring popularity by charting at no. 14 in the year of its release.  Greatest Hits on Earth remained in print for decades. 

Of note:
 The version of "Aquarius/Let the Sunshine In" included here is a shortened version of the 4:49 single release which ranked no. 2 in Billboard's listing of top Hot 100 singles of 1969. It omits the reprise of the first verse. The album cover makes no mention of this being a shortened version of the hit. 
 "The Worst That Could Happen" was not a hit for The 5th Dimension, as it was not released as a single.  Johnny Maestro & The Brooklyn Bridge had a hit with the song in early 1969.  However, The 5th Dimension's version came first, released on their album entitled The Magic Garden.
 "The Girls' Song" is the 5th Dimension's final single release on Soul City and was issued specifically to coincide with this album.  Originally appearing on The Magic Garden, the single was the band's least successful in three years, due in part to competing with Bell Records' release of new material.

Track listing

Side One
"Aquarius/Let the Sunshine In"
"The Girls' Song"
"Stoned Soul Picnic"
"The Worst That Could Happen"
"Wedding Bell Blues"
"California Soul"

Side Two
"Up – Up and Away"
"Blowin' Away"
"Carpet Man"
"Workin' On a Groovy Thing"
"Paper Cup"
"Sweet Blindness"

Personnel
Marilyn McCoo – vocals
Florence LaRue – vocals
Billy Davis, Jr. – vocals
Lamonte McLemore – vocals
Ron Townson – vocals

Musicians
Hal Blaine – drums, percussion
Joe Osborn, Larry Knechtel – bass
Jimmy Webb, Larry Knechtel, Jimmy Rowles, Pete Jolly – keyboards
Ray Pohlman, Johnny Rivers, Al Casey, Dennis Budimir, Mike Deasy, Bill Fulton – guitars
Larry Bunker – congas, mallets, percussion

Charts

The 5th Dimension albums
1970 compilation albums
Soul City Records (American label) albums
Albums recorded at United Western Recorders
Albums recorded at Wally Heider Studios